Brothers of the Road is the eighth studio album, and tenth album overall, by the rock group the Allman Brothers Band.  Released in 1981, it is the band's sole album without drummer Jai Johanny Johanson, the last to feature bassist David Goldflies and guitarist Dan Toler, and the only one to feature drummer David Toler. The song "Straight from the Heart" was the group's third and final Top 40 hit. It was also the first Allman Brothers album to not feature an instrumental song.

Track listing

Side One
"Brothers of the Road" (Dickey Betts, Jim Goff) – 3:50
"Leavin'" (Gregg Allman) – 3:46
"Straight from the Heart" (Betts, Johnny Cobb) – 3:48
"The Heat Is On" (Betts, Mike Lawler, Buddy Yochim) – 4:13
"Maybe We Can Go Back to Yesterday" (Betts, Dan Toler) – 4:42

Side Two
"The Judgment" (Betts) – 3:39
"Two Rights" (Betts, Cobb, Lawler) – 3:30
"Never Knew How Much (I Needed You)" (Allman) – 4:45
"Things You Used to Do" (Allman, Keith England) – 3:42
"I Beg of You" (Rose Marie McCoy, Kelly Owens) – 3:22

Personnel

The Allman Brothers Band
Gregg Allman – lead vocals, organ, acoustic guitar
Dickey Betts – lead, slide, and acoustic guitar, lead vocals on 1, 4, 6, 7
Butch Trucks – drums
David "Rook" Goldflies – bass
Mike Lawler – pianos, synthesizers, clavinet
"Dangerous" Dan Toler – lead and rhythm guitar
David "Frankie" Toler – drums

Additional musicians
Charlie Daniels – fiddle on "Brothers of the Road"
Jimmy Hall – sax on "Never Knew How Much (I Needed You)"
Mark "Tito" Morris – congas, timbales, percussion
Background vocalists: Thomas Cain, Johnny Cobb, Jimmy Hall, Chip Young, Greg Guidry, Joy Lannon, Donna McElroy, Keith England, Jeff Silverman, Randall Hart, Peter Kingsberry, Joe Pizzulo

References

The Allman Brothers Band albums
1981 albums
Arista Records albums